The 1948–49 Soviet Championship League season was the third season of the Soviet Championship League, the top level of ice hockey in the Soviet Union. 10 teams participated in the league, and CDKA Moscow won the championship.

Standings

External links
Season on hockeystars.ru

Soviet League seasons
1948–49 in Soviet ice hockey
Soviet